Wallsend is a locality in the West Coast region of New Zealand, located on the south side of the Grey River. It is located opposite Taylorville. The two settlements were connected via a suspension bridge for pedestrians that was known as the Taylorville bridge.

The church in Wallsend was St Saviour's.

In a large fire on 4 January 1933, the Union Hotel (where the fire started), the Empire Hotel, a billiard room, the library and a private house were destroyed. Another hotel, the Albion, burned down on 31 August 1934. The Wentworth Hall, principally used for dances and built in 1935, burned down on 1 August 1936.

References

Grey District
Populated places in the West Coast, New Zealand